Thunchan Memorial Government College, is a general degree college located in Tirur, Malappuram district, Kerala. It was established in the year 1980. The college is affiliated to Calicut University. This college offers different courses in arts, commerce and science.

Accreditation
The college is  recognized by the University Grants Commission (UGC).

Notable alumni
 N. Samsudheen, MLA

See also

References

External links
http://www.tmgctirur.org
University of Calicut
University Grants Commission
National Assessment and Accreditation Council

Universities and colleges in Malappuram district
Educational institutions established in 1980
1980 establishments in Kerala
Arts and Science colleges in Kerala
Colleges affiliated with the University of Calicut